The 2014–15 East Tennessee State Buccaneers basketball team represented East Tennessee State University during the 2014–15 NCAA Division I men's basketball season. The Buccaneers, led by 12th year head coach Murry Bartow, played their home games at the Freedom Hall Civic Center and returned as members of the Southern Conference, a conference they left in 2005. They finished the season 16–14, 8–10 in SoCon play to finish in fifth place. They lost in the quarterfinals of the SoCon tournament to Western Carolina.

On March 12, head coach Murry Bartow was fired. He had a record of 224–169 in 12 seasons.

Roster

Schedule

 
|-
!colspan=9 style="background:#041E42; color:#FFC72C;"| Exhibition
|-

|-
!colspan=9 style="background:#041E42; color:#FFC72C;"| Regular season
|-

|-
!colspan=9 style="background:#041E42; color:#FFC72C;"| SoCon tournament

References

East Tennessee State Buccaneers men's basketball seasons
East Tennessee State
East Tennessee
East Tennessee